Angelo Accattino (born 31 July 1966) is an Italian prelate of the Catholic Church who works in the diplomatic service of the Holy See.

Biography 
Angelo Accattino was born on 31 July 1966 in Asti, Italy. He studied at the seminary in Casale and was ordained a priest of the Diocese of Casale Monferrato on 25 June 1994. He holds a doctorate in canon law.

He studied at the Pontifical Ecclesiastical Academy and entered the diplomatic service of the Holy See on 1 July 1999 and filled assignments in Trinidad and Tobago, Colombia, and Peru; in Rome in the offices of the Secretariat of State; and in the United States and Turkey.

On 12 September 2017, Pope Francis appointed him Titular Archbishop of Sebana and the Apostolic Nuncio to Bolivia. He received his episcopal consecration from Cardinal Pietro Parolin on 25 November 2017 in Calliano.

On 2 January 2023, Pope Francis appointed him as nuncio to Tanzania.

See also
 List of heads of the diplomatic missions of the Holy See

References

External links
Catholic Hierarchy: Archbishop Angelo Accattino 

1966 births
Living people
People from Asti
Apostolic Nuncios to Bolivia
Apostolic Nuncios to Tanzania